Sachiko Kodama (born 1970) is a Japanese artist. She is best known for her artwork using ferrofluid, a dark colloidal suspension of magnetic nano-particles dispersed in solution which remains strongly magnetic in its fluid.
By controlling the fluid with a magnetic field, it is formed to create complex 3-dimensional shapes as a "liquid sculpture".

Biography
Kodama was born in Kagoshima Prefecture and raised in the Shizuoka Prefecture. Kagoshima is the southwestern tip of the Kyushu island of Japan. It is a subtropical area. Its biological diversity greatly inspired her curiosity toward art and science. She graduated in physics at the Department of Science at Hokkaido University in 1993 then shifting her focus, entered the University of Tsukuba's Graduate School of Art and Design. After holding a PhD in art from the University of Tsukuba she has been teaching in the University of Electro-communications in Tokyo as an associate professor.

Shows and exhibitions
Kodama started working in ferrofluid with her project "Protrude, Flow" in 2000, created in collaboration with Minako Takeno. "Protrude, Flow" was exhibited at the SIGGRAPH 2001 Art Gallery, the Skirball Cultural Center in Los Angeles, and the Mood River exhibition held at the Wexner Center for the Arts in Columbus.

In 2010 Kodama exhibited "Morpho Tower" and "Breathing Chaos" at Cyber Arts Japan, a media art exhibition hosted by the Museum of Contemporary Art Tokyo. Matthew Larking described her work as "Sachiko Kodama's small yet powerful piece "Morpho Tower" displays a seemingly organic life form, which is actually ferrofluid dynamically sculpted by electromagnets."

Also, 'Transmutation' Exhibition, Highline Loft, New York 2012.

Solo Exhibitions
1996
 Sachiko Kodama Exhibition, Gallery Kobayashi (Tokyo)

2004
 Sachiko Kodama, Breathing Chaos, Telic Gallery (LA)

2005
 The dynamic fluid – hide and seek for sea urchins – Sachiko Kodama's magnetic fluid art project, Science Museum (Tokyo) 

2006
 Sachiko Kodama Morphotower, Gallery Sakamaki (Tokyo)

 2008
 Sachiko Kodama Morphotower, Gallery Sakamaki (Tokyo)

2010
 Sachiko Kodama – Invisible Garden, Miraikan (The National Museum of Emerging Science and Innovation (Tokyo))

2011
 Sachiko Kodama – My Little Sea, NC Soft Creative Fountain (Seoul)
 Sachiko Kodama, Input/Output Gallery (Hong Kong)

2012
 Sachiko Kodama – Solo Exhibition, Agora Art Project × Space (Taipei)

2016
 Sachiko Kodama: Ferrofluid Sculpture and Design of New Media Art, Chofu City Cultural Center Tazukuri (Tokyo)

2017
 Sachiko Kodama – Éblouissant, Seikado (Kyoto)

2019
 Sachiko Kodama - On Dazzling, Tokyo Publishing House (Tokyo)

2020
 Open Studio Program 78 Sachiko Kodama: Pulsate – Melting Vision and Melting Moment, Rhythm in Motion, Fuchu Art Museum (Tokyo)

2021
 Sachiko Kodama Nihombashi Takashimaya Art Gallery X (Tokyo)

Group Exhibitions
1998
 Para para parallax exhibition, Gallery NW House (Tokyo)

2001
 Interaction 01 Exhibition, Softopia Japan Center, organizer: IAMAS Institute of Advanced Media Arts and Sciences (Gifu Prefecture)

2002
 Japan Media Arts Exhibition 2002, CAFA (Central Academy of Fine Arts) Art Museum (Beijing)

2004
 Navigator - Digital Art in the Making, National Taiwan Museum of Fine Arts (Taichung)
 Time/Space, Gravity, and Light, Skirball Cultural Center (LA)

2005
 Meta visual: 10e anniversaire du Tokyo Metropolitan Museum of Photography, Centre des Arts d'Enghien-les-Bains (Enghien-les-Bains, France)
 Digital Art Festival Tokyo 2005, Panasonic Center (Tokyo)

2006
 Japan Media Arts Festival, Tokyo Photographic Art Museum (Tokyo)
 Electrical Fantasista, BankART Studio NYK (Yokohama)
 Woman's Perspective in New Media, Bitforms Gallery Seoul (Seoul)

2007
 Contemporary Artists of South Kyushu － Message 2007, Miyakonojo City Museum of Art
 The Power of Expression, JAPAN, The National Art Center (Tokyo)
 Electronic Alive IV, Scarfone Gallery, University of Tampa (FL)
 Japan Media Arts Festival 2007 in Shanghai, Shanghai Sculpture space (Shanghai)
 Haptic Literacture – Intersection of text/media art, Tokyo Photographic Art Museum (Tokyo)

2008
 Sculpture in Motion: Art Choreographed by Nature, Atlanta Botanical Garden
 Machines & Souls, Arte Digital y Nuevos Medios, Museo Nacional Centro de Arte Reina Sofía, MNCARS (Madrid)
 Andy Moses, Sachiko Kodama, Ewerdt Hilgemann, Samuel Freeman Gallery (Santa Monica)
 SIGGRAPH ASIA 2008, Art Gallery – Curated Show, Suntec Singapore International Convention & Exhibition Centre (Singapore) 

2009
 Summer vacation for me and art, Ichihara Lakeside Museum (Chiba Prefecture)
 Device Art Exhibition, Ars Electronica Center (Linz)
 Device_art 3.009, Kontejner (Croatia) 
 Art Future 2009, Auditorio IMAGINA (Barcelona)

2010
 Ars Electronica – 30 years for Art and Media Technology, The Museum of Contemporary Art Tokyo
 Silicon dreams. Art, Science & Technology in the European Union Tabakelera (San Sebastián)
 Poetry of Motion, Ars Electronica at Automobil Forum Unter den Linden (Berlin)
 Magic Art Museum Exhibition, Oita Art Museum
 Japan Media Arts Festival in Istanbul, Pera Museum (Istanbul)
 Japan Media Arts Festival Travelling Exhibition in Sapporo, Sapporo Art Park (Sapporo)

2011
 Art Futura XXI Alhóndiga Bilbao (Bilbao)
 Left to my own devices, INSPACE (Scotland)
 Magic Art Museum Exhibition, Morioka Civic Cultural Hall (Morioka Prefecture, akehara Museum (Hiroshima)
 Close Your Eyes and Tell Me What You See, Göteborgs konstmuseum (Sweden)
 Close Your Eyes and Tell Me What You See, Vartiovuoren tähtitorni (Finland)

2012
 MEDIA GEIJUTSU Flow & Bright, GYRE (Tokyo)
 Transmurtation, Highline Loft (NY)
 Art Rock Festival, Pavillon des Arts Numériques, Musée de Saint-Brieuc (Saint-Brieuc)
 Turbulence, Espaces Louis Vuitton (Paris)
 Mugendai Art Exhibition, Hamada Children's Museum of Art (Tottori Prefecture)
 Magic Art Museum Exhibition, Yumeminato Tower (Tottori Prefecture), Matsuzakaya Art Museum (Nagoya)

2013
 Japan Media Arts Festival in Yamanashi, Yamanashi Prefectural Library (Yamanashi Prefecture)
 Turbulences II, Villa Empain (Brussels)
 We are in complete control 3:e Våningen (Göteborg)
 Lille 3000, Natures Artificielles, Gare Saint Sauveur (Lille)
 Aomori Earth 2013 － Brave New World – Re-Enchanting Utopia, Aomori Museum of ArtMagic Art Museum Exhibition, Miyazaki Prefectural Art Museum, Contemporary Art Museum, Kumamoto, The Ueno Royal Museum, 21st Century Museum of Contemporary Art, Okayama City Museum
 Design Shanghai 2013, Power Station of Art (Shanghai)

2014
 Boundless Fantasy: Multimedia Art from East Asia, Charles B. Wang Center,
 The State University of New York at Stony Brook (New York)
 Ankoku, Galerie-da end (Paris)

2015
 LIVE: Work from the Collections #5, Chelsea Space, University of the Arts London

2016
 Japan Media Arts Festival 20th Anniversary Exhibition – Power to Change, 3331 Arts Chiyoda (Tokyo) 

2017
 ArtFitura Rome: Digital Creature, Ex Dogana (Rome)
 Nuit Blanche KYOTO 2017, Seikado (Kyoto)
 Japan Media Arts Festival in Ishigaki Jima Island (Okinawa)
 Imaginary Guide: Japan, Mystetskyi Arsenal (Kyiv)

2020
 Japan Media Arts Festival in Otaru,Canal Plaza (Otaru) 
 Pharmakon Chain Reaction， Atelier Mitsushima (Kyoto)

2021
 Vision Gate Exhibition, Haneda/Narita Airport (Tokyo，Chiba)

Other
2010
 The Armory Show 2010, Piers 92 & 94 (New York)

2011
 Chanel J12 watch events (Paris, Tokyo, New York)

2015
 Art Paris Art Fair 2015, Galerie-da end (Paris)

Awards
1994
 Fukui International Youth Media Art Festival

1995
 Accepted for International Biennale in Nagoya - ARTEC'95 

1997
 Accepted for International Biennale in Nagoya - ARTEC'97 

2001
 Accepted for SIGGRAPH 2001 Art Gallery (Los Angeles)

2002
 Awarded Grand Prize of Digital Art (Interactive Art) Division at the 5th Media Art Festival, Agency for Cultural Affairs, Japan
 Digital Content Grand Prix 2001 Grand Prize in Art 
 Japan Information-Culturology Society, Art Award 

2005
 Accepted for VIDEOEX 2005 International Experimental Film & Video Festival
 Accepted for the Ninth Annual MadCat Women's International Film Festival 

2006
 Accepted for SIGGRAPH 2006 Art Gallery (Boston)

2009-2010
 Accepted for Program of Overseas Study for Upcoming Artists by Agency of Cultural Affairs, Government of Japan (New York)

Commission Works
 Ars Electronica Center (Linz, Austria)
 Wonder Museum (Okinawa, Japan)
 National Science Technology Museum (Kaohsiung, Taiwan)
 Panasonic Center Tokyo Creative Museum AkeruE (Tokyo, Japan)
 SpaceLABO (Fukuoka, Japan)

Collections
 Miyakonojo City Museum of Art (Japan)
 Boghossian Foundation (Belgium)
 ArtFutura (Spain)

References

External links
 
 Sachiko Kodama online Portfolio

Japanese artists
1970 births
Living people
Artists from Kagoshima Prefecture